Ügyek (second half of the 8th century – first half of the 9th century), also known as Ugek or Ugec (also styled Vgec), was – according to the chronicler Anonymus (or "Master P.") – the father of Álmos, the first Grand Prince of the Hungarians. However, according to a conflicting source, Simon of Kéza (writing about five to eight decades later), Előd was the father of Álmos, while the chronicler referred to Ügyek as Álmos' grandfather. He is the earliest known ancestor of the Árpád dynasty. He was said to be a Scythian, i.e. to be from Dentumoger, the homeland of the Magyars, which the chroniclers identify with Scythia, and use to refer both to the land and its inhabitants.

Life

Ügyek was born in the last third of the 8th century. Anonymus writes that Ügyek married Emese, a daughter of "Prince Eunedubelian" in 819. She had seen a divine dream of a Turul bird before Álmos's birth in c. 820, according to the chronicles. The Turul's role is interpreted as guardian spirit, who protects the baby from harm until he grows up. It is supported by the chronicles, according to whom the Turul appears to the already pregnant woman.

Historian Gyula Kristó said Ügyek's name may have been the chronicler' invention, since it derives from the ancient Hungarian ügy ("saint, holy") word.

Meaning of the name 
Anonymus gives the name as Ugec; this caused much speculation later, as to the meaning of it. The latest research on the subject gives the following explanations regarding the origin and meaning of the name:
 Ügyek - Dezső Pais, in his book of 1926, put forward the idea that the name is to be derived from the Hungarian word igy/egy (‛holy’). Gyula Kristó also shared this view.
 Öge/Üge - Dignitary name, according to historian György Györffy. The meaning of it is "wise" and "sage", also "councillor". The word, as 10% words in modern Hungarian, is of Turkic origin. Many Hungarian personal names, and also animal and plant names, are of Turkic origin. Further, the majority of Hungarian tribal names were of Turkic origin, who overall made a significant contribution to Hungarians during their century-long cohabitation.
 Üge - The last ruler of the Uyghur Empire, also a contemporary to Ügyek. He was murdered in 846 in the Altai Mountains. It is speculated, that when the Empire fell apart, some Uyghur fragments could have escaped westward.

Significance 
There are three types of great ancestry in the traditional steppe culture.
 The distant, 'spiritual' ancestor, who took an important step, but the real power of his dynasty came many generations later;
 The founder of an empire, that is inherited by the descendants;
 Someone important in the family tree, related to whom the descendants must define themselves.
Ügyek clearly belongs to the first group. Other examples belonging to this category are Ertogrul, (father of Osman), Sheikh Safi (founder of the Safavids), Saman Khuda (founder of the Samanids), among many others. The Turul narrative is strongly reminiscent of an episode narrated in The Secret History of the Mongols, concerning the foundation of the royal Mongol dynasty. All these traditions popular among different peoples, including the Magyars, were informed by the traditional steppe culture, and do not belong to any specific ethnic group.

Family trees

According to Anonymus's Gesta Hungarorum:

:

According to Simon of Kéza's Gesta Hunnorum et Hungarorum:

According to Mark of Kalt's Chronicon Pictum:

:

See also
 Şilki

Notes

Notes and references

Notes

References

Sources
 B. Szabó János – Sudár Balázs: "Vgec-ügyek – Egy elfeledett ősapa". In: Türk Attila (szerk.): Hadak útján XXIV. A népvándorláskor fiatal kutatóinak XXIV. konferenciája Esztergom, 2014. november 4–6. 2. kötet. PPKE – ELTE, Budapest–Esztergom, 2017. 223–231. o. Contains a summary in English at the end. 
 Kristó, Gyula - Makk, Ferenc: Az Árpád-ház uralkodói (IPC Könyvek, 1996)
 Korai Magyar Történeti Lexikon (9-14. század), főszerkesztő: Kristó, Gyula, szerkesztők: Engel, Pál és Makk, Ferenc (Akadémiai Kiadó, Budapest, 1994)

Hungarian prehistory
Magyar tribal chieftains
House of Árpád
8th-century Hungarian people
9th-century Hungarian people